Suck is a 2009 rock-and-roll vampire black comedy horror film starring, written and directed by Rob Stefaniuk. Stefaniuk stars alongside Canadian actress Jessica Paré, Nicole de Boer (Stefaniuk's castmate from the TV series Catwalk), Malcolm McDowell and rock artists Alice Cooper, Iggy Pop, Henry Rollins and Alex Lifeson of Rush. Production took place in and around Toronto in late 2008.

Plot
The film follows a struggling rock band called the Winners as they tour across Canada and the United States. After band member Jennifer is turned into a vampire, the band quickly gains a following of groupies attracted to her newfound beauty. As their infamy grows, the vampire hunter Eddie Van Helsing learns that Jennifer is a vampire and vows to hunt her down.

While on tour, the band members are each turned into vampires, one by one. Although the band continues to grow in popularity, band member Joey loses interest in the vampire lifestyle after accidentally killing their producer, Victor, and eventually convinces Jennifer that they should become human again. After a brief altercation, Eddie agrees to help the band upon hearing of their plans to become human. They track down Queenie, the vampire who turned Jennifer, intending to kill him. During the fight, Queenie kills Sam and nearly kills Eddie, before he is stabbed in the heart by Joey. The band members become human again as a result of his death, and they happily return home.

Six months later, Joey and Jennifer are shown to have grown bored with their human lives in suburbia. They are approached by a bartender who had previously served at their gigs; he reveals himself to be an entity more powerful even than Queenie (the implication being that the bartender is Satan himself) and he offers them the opportunity to be even more powerful and more famous than they were as vampires. It is implied that Joey and Jennifer accept the offer, despite the chaos caused during their time as vampires.

Cast
Rob Stefaniuk as Joey Winner
Jessica Paré as Jennifer
Paul Anthony as Tyler
Mike Lobel as Sam
Chris Ratz as Hugo
Alice Cooper as Bartender
Malcolm McDowell as Eddie Van Helsing
Dimitri Coats as Queenie
Iggy Pop as Victor
Dave Foley as Jeff
Moby as Beef Bellows
Henry Rollins as Rockin' Roger
Alex Lifeson as Border Guard
Danny Smith as Jerry
Nicole de Boer as Susan
Carole Pope as Club Bouncer
Calico Cooper as Barmaid
Barbara Mamabolo as Danielle

Production

Filming
Filming commenced November 23, 2008 in the Toronto area. It was filmed on location, and many of the clubs throughout the film are underground clubs and bars in Toronto such as The Big Bop (accounting for three of the clubs, each floor representing a different city on the tour). Members of Toronto's goth scene were requested to perform as background extras for some of the club scenes.

The US Customs scenes were shot at Toronto's defunct International Marine Passenger Terminal.

Filming lasted 20 days, on a budget of about $3.5 million (CAD).

In the scene where Danielle sings "Night After Night", Eddie Van Helsing has flashbacks to his younger self.  Footage from the 1973 film "O Lucky Man!", which starred Malcolm McDowell, was edited into the scene.

Release
Rights to the film were acquired by Alliance Films. It premiered on September 11, 2009 at the Toronto International Film Festival and was part of the South by Southwest Film Festival (SXSW) 2010 in Austin, Texas. E1 Entertainment holds the rights for the Home video (Blu-ray and DVD), VOD, digital and TV sales.

Soundtrack listing
 Going Nowhere - The Winners
 This Is Your Brain on Drugs - The Winners
 I'm Coming To Get You - The Winners
 Sympathy For the Devil - Styrofoam Bible
 If One of Us Goes Further - Burning Brides
 Suck - The Winners
 Night After Night - Mamabolo
 Flesh and Bone - Burning Brides
 So Close It Hurts - The Winners
 Take It - The Winners
 The Fool - The Winners
 Still Bleeding - Secretaries of Steak

See also
Slapstick film
Vampire film

References

External links
 
 

2009 films
English-language Canadian films
Vampire comedy films
Canadian rock music films
Canadian vampire films
Canadian comedy horror films
2000s English-language films
2000s Canadian films